Dibromodifluoromethane is a mixed halomethane. It is a colorless non-flammable liquid.

Along with Halons 1211, 2402, and 1301, it is one of the most effective fire extinguishers, however, it is also very toxic.

It is a class I ozone depleting substance (ODS).

Table of physical properties

References

External links 
 
 
 Photolysis of dibromodifluoromethane at 265 nm
 Raman and infrared spectra of solid dibromodifluoromethane

Halomethanes
Fire suppression agents
Ozone depletion
Organobromides
Organofluorides